The 1987–88 Minnesota Strikers season of the Major Indoor Soccer League was the fourth season of the team in the indoor league, and the club's twenty-first season in professional soccer.  This year, the team finished first in the Eastern Division of the regular season.  They made it to the playoffs and were a semifinalist.  This was the last year of the team as the club folded it and moved back to Fort Lauderdale.  There, the club fielded a new outdoor team named the Fort Lauderdale Strikers for the 1988 season of the new American Soccer League.

Background

Review

Competitions

MISL regular season 

Playoff teams in bold.

Results summaries

Results by round

Match reports

MISL Playoffs 

QUARTER-FINALS:   
Minnesota defeated Baltimore, 5-3, 4-2, 1-5, 9-4
Cleveland defeated Dallas, 3-2, 3-6, 5-4 (2OT), 5-2
Kansas City defeated Los Angeles, 9-6, 4-2, 7-5
San Diego defeated Tacoma, 6-2, 3-4 (OT), 7-2, 7-6
SEMI-FINALS:   
Cleveland defeated Minnesota, 7-3, 0-7, 5-4, 5-2, 7-2
San Diego defeated Kansas City, 4-5, 5-4, 6-7(OT), 3-7, 7-1, 6-1, 8-5

Bracket

Match reports

Statistics

Transfers

References 

Minnesota Strikers seasons
Minnesota Strikers
Minnesota Strikers
Minnesota Strikers